Dulcy is a 1923 American silent comedy film directed by Sidney A. Franklin and starring Constance Talmadge. The film was adapted from the Broadway production of the same name written by George S. Kaufman and Marc Connelly. The play opened in New York in August 1921 and ran for 241 performances.

Cast

Remake
A sound, pre-code version called Not So Dumb was made in 1930 starring Marion Davies, directed by King Vidor, and produced for Cosmopolitan Productions for Metro-Goldwyn-Mayer.

Another version of Dulcy was made in 1940 by Metro-Goldwyn-Mayer. It stars Ann Sothern in the title role, and was directed by S. Sylvan Simon.

Preservation
With no prints of Dulcy located in any film archives, it is a lost film.

References

External links

1923 films
1923 comedy films
Silent American comedy films
American silent feature films
American black-and-white films
American films based on plays
Lost American films
1923 lost films
Lost comedy films
Films directed by Sidney Franklin
1920s American films
1920s English-language films